The Great War is a 1959 Italian comedy-drama war film directed by Mario Monicelli. It tells the story of an odd couple of army buddies in World War I; the movie, while played on a comedic register, does not hide from the viewer the horrors and grimness of trench warfare. Starring Alberto Sordi and Vittorio Gassman and produced by Dino De Laurentiis, the film won the Golden Lion at the Venice Film Festival. Its crew also included Danilo Donati (costumes) and Mario Garbuglia (set designer).

It was an Academy Award nominee as Best Foreign Film. In 1999 the critics of Ciak magazine chose it as one of the 100 most important films in history, and was selected to enter the list of the "100 Italian films to be saved". It won huge success outside Italy, especially in France.

Plot
1916. The Roman Oreste Jacovacci (Alberto Sordi) and Giovanni Busacca (Vittorio Gassman) meet in a military district during the call to arms. The former promises to deceive the other in exchange for money. The two meet again on a train to the front: after Giovanni's initial anger, they end up sympathizing and becoming friends. Although completely different in character, they are united by the lack of any ideal and the desire to avoid any danger in order to emerge unscathed from the war. After going through numerous vicissitudes during training, fighting and rare leave, they witness the Italian defeat at Caporetto. The following day, they are commanded as relay runners, a very dangerous task, which is entrusted to them because they are considered to be the "least efficient" of the troop.

One evening, after carrying out their mission, they lie down in the stable of an outpost not far from the front line, but a sudden advance of the Austrians leaves them to enemy territory. Surprised to wear coats of the Austro-Hungarian army in an attempt to escape, they are captured, accused of espionage and threatened with shooting. Overwhelmed by fear, they admit that they have crucial information on the Italian counterattack on Piave river, and in order to save themselves, they decide to pass it on to the enemy. The arrogance of the Austrian officer and a joke of contempt for the Italians, however, offends them personally and restores strength to their dignity, leading them to keep the secret until the execution. Giovanni insults the Austrian officer, while Oreste shouts he is not aware of the information and is shot shortly after his friend.

The battle ends shortly after, with the victory of the Italian army and the reconquest of the position fallen into the hands of the Austrians. The film ends with Oreste and Giovanni's captain who, ignoring their sacrifice, comments about their escape.

Cast
 Alberto Sordi: Oreste Jacovacci
 Vittorio Gassman: Giovanni Busacca
 Silvana Mangano: Costantina
 Folco Lulli: Private Bordin
 Bernard Blier: Captain Castelli
 Romolo Valli: Lieutenant Gallina
 Vittorio Sanipoli: Major Venturi
 Nicola Arigliano: Private Giardino
 Geronimo Meynier: Messenger
 Mario Valdemarin: Lieutenant Loquenzi
 Elsa Vazzoler: Mrs. Bordin
 Tiberio Murgia: Private Rosario Nicotra
 Livio Lorenzon: Sergeant Battiferri
 Ferruccio Amendola: Private De Concini
 Gianni Baghino: A soldier
 Carlo D'Angelo: Captain Ferri
 Achille Compagnoni: Chaplain
 Luigi Fainelli: Private Giacomazzi
 Marcello Giorda: General
 Tiberio Mitri: Private Mandich
 Gérard Herter: Austrian captain
 Guido Celano: Italian major

Analysis
The film is an ironic account of life in the trenches on the Italian front of World War I and the vicissitudes of a group of comrades fighting there in 1916. It is narrated in a simultaneously neorealist and romantic idiom, combining typical features of Italian comedy with attention to historical detail. One review wrote that it "realises a fusion, in some ways unsurpassed, through criticism dressed as comedy and the perspective of historical criticism capable of dealing with the past with the same lucidity and with the same anti-conformity as that shown by cinema following the eveolution of contemporary Italian society. Another review stated "Italian comedy was getting to grips with grand cinema and this had to pass through a direct contact with social reality and great labour in psychologically defining character.

The remarkable crowd scenes are accompanied by acute characterizations of many characters, human and fearful anti-heroes, resigned to their fate in solidarity with each other, united by their enforced participation in a disaster which in the end overwhelms them. Monicelli and his scriptwriters Age & Scarpelli and Luciano Vincenzoni reached the pinnacle of their careers with this film, combining artistic skill with unparalleled fluidity of storytelling, comedy and dramatic tone, and paving the way for a new style of war film. In the citation for an honorary degree from the University of Udine on 30 May 2005, Monicelli was rewarded "for his extraordinary contribution to [public] knowledge of Italian history through his films, particularly 'The Great War'. A master of cinematography and the course of history, but also ... a kind of master ... who taught us things we will remember for a lifetime."

The short final sequence shows the two main characters redeem themselves by making a small but courageous gesture of sacrifice, one as a "swaggering hero" and the other as a "heroic coward", the latter being Sordi's role, for which he won the Nastro d'Argento for Best Actor. One reviewer wrote:

The reconstruction of wartime life is, from a historical point of view, one of the best contributions by Italian cinema to the study of the First World War. For the first time a representation of that war was purged of the rhetoric of Fascist and Second World War propaganda, which continued the myth of Italy fighting a successful and heroic war, meaning The Great War had problems with the censors and banned for under 18s. One reviewer wrote "Its antirhetorical character brought press reactions right from the start of filming, but its public success contributed more than anything else to the de-mythologising of patriotic and romantic historiography which had always clouded the massacre that was the First World War under the oratory of ardour and sacrifice." Until then Italian soldiers had always been portrayed as courageous and willing men sacrificing themselves for their country. The film also denounces the absurdity and violence of the conflict and the miserable living conditions of civilians and soldiers, but also speaks strongly about the friendships which grew up among soldiers from very different classes, cultures and regions of Italy. Forced to live side by side, the soldiers' regional rivalries and provincial nature, never thrown together before for so long, helps to partly form a national spirit that before then was nearly non-existent, in strong contrast to Italy's commanders and institutions, which are shown as the main things to blame for the war.

Production
The film was born out of an idea by Luciano Vincenzoni, influenced by "Two friends", a story by Guy de Maupassant. Initially thought of as a star vehicle just for Gassman, it was the producer De Laurentiis who decided to add another character, played by Sordi. The screenplay combined characters and situations from two famous books - "A Year on the Plateau" by Emilio Lussu and “Con me e con gli alpini” by Piero Jahier. In an interview, the director himself stated:

The journalist and writer Carlo Salsa, who had actually fought in these areas in the First World War, was a script consultant, helping with the story, dialogue and background, all particularly vivid and original. The scenes were mostly shot in the province of Udine, at Gemona del Friuli, near Venzone, at Sella Sant'Agnese, in the fort at Palmanova and in the Nespoledo district of Lestizza from 25 May to mid-June 1959. Other scenes were filmed in Campania at San Pietro Infine.

Awards and nominations

Nominations
Academy Award for Best Foreign Film

Wins
 Golden Lion at the Venice Film Festival (1959)
 David di Donatello for Best Producer (1960)
 David di Donatello for Best Actor (Gassmann and Sordi jointly) (1960)
 Nastro d'Argento Best Design (Mario Garbuglia) (1960)
 Nastro d'Argento for Best Actor (Sordi) (1960)

See also
 List of submissions to the 32nd Academy Awards for Best Foreign Language Film
 List of Italian submissions for the Academy Award for Best Foreign Language Film 
 List of anti-war films

References

External links
 
 

1959 films
Italian war comedy-drama films
1950s Italian-language films
Films scored by Nino Rota
Commedia all'italiana
French black-and-white films
Films set in Friuli-Venezia Giulia
Films directed by Mario Monicelli
World War I films set on the Italian Front
Golden Lion winners
Films with screenplays by Age & Scarpelli
Films produced by Dino De Laurentiis
1950s war comedy-drama films
Films with screenplays by Luciano Vincenzoni
1950s Italian films
Italian World War I films